The 2014 Stanley Cup playoffs of the National Hockey League (NHL) began on April 16, 2014, and ended June 13, 2014 when the Los Angeles Kings defeated the New York Rangers four games to one in the Stanley Cup Finals.

The Boston Bruins made the playoffs as Presidents' Trophy winners with the most points (i.e. best record) during the regular season. The Detroit Red Wings increased their consecutive playoff appearance streak to 23 seasons, the longest streak at the time and the fifth longest streak in NHL history. The Dallas Stars ended the league's third longest active playoff appearance drought, qualifying for the postseason for the first time in six years. For the first time since 1973, only one Canadian team qualified for the playoffs: the Montreal Canadiens. This was also the first time since the 1978 Stanley Cup playoffs that no playoff games were played in Western Canada. For the third time in four years, all three California-based teams again made the playoffs. The Columbus Blue Jackets won their first franchise playoff game on April 19, 2014, and their first ever franchise playoff home game at Nationwide Arena on April 23, 2014, both against the Pittsburgh Penguins. Three Original Six teams reached the Conference Finals, the first time this has occurred since 1979.

The First Round featured leads changing hands more so than any previous year. After the Anaheim Ducks rallied from a 4–2 deficit to defeat the Dallas Stars in game six of their First Round series on April 27, 2014, an NHL record was broken for most multi-goal comebacks by all teams in the opening round, with ten. In all four rounds combined in the previous year's playoffs, there were only eight such victories. The San Jose Sharks became the fourth team in Stanley Cup playoff history to lose a series after holding a 3–0 lead; as the Los Angeles Kings came back to win the series in game seven of the First Round on April 30, 2014.

On May 29, 2014, the New York Rangers became the first team to ever advance past the Conference Finals after playing two seven-game series in the opening two rounds. The Rangers also became the first captainless team to reach the finals since the Chicago Black Hawks in 1973. That same seven-game mark was eclipsed on June 1, 2014, as the Los Angeles Kings became the first team to ever reach the Stanley Cup Finals after having played three consecutive seven-game series. Los Angeles played all three of their game sevens on the road. Game five of the Stanley Cup Finals marked the 93rd game of the 2014 playoffs, eclipsing the previous single-year record 92 established in 1991; this remains the record for the most games played using a sixteen team playoff format. The record for most games played in a single year was broken during the expanded 2020 Stanley Cup playoffs.

The Kings tied the 1987 Philadelphia Flyers and the 2004 Calgary Flames, for most games played (26) in one playoff year (later matched by the 2015 Tampa Bay Lightning and 2019 St. Louis Blues). The record was subsequently broken by the 2020 Dallas Stars during the 2020 Stanley Cup playoffs.

Playoff seeds

The NHL adopted a new league alignment for the 2013–14 season, as the Detroit Red Wings and Columbus Blue Jackets were moved to the Eastern Conference and the Winnipeg Jets to the Western Conference. The 16-team Eastern Conference was then divided into two 8-team divisions (Metropolitan and Atlantic), while the 14-team Western Conference was divided into two 7-team divisions (Pacific and Central). As part of the realignment, the NHL also switched its former conference-based playoff structure to a divisional-based playoff structure. The top three teams from each division qualified for that conference's playoffs. The remaining two playoff spots in each conference were wild card teams, which were the top two clubs from each conference that failed to win a divisional playoff spot.

The following teams qualified for the playoffs:

Eastern Conference

Atlantic Division
 Boston Bruins, Atlantic Division champions, Eastern Conference regular season champions, Presidents' Trophy winners – 117 points
 Tampa Bay Lightning – 101 points
 Montreal Canadiens – 100 points

Metropolitan Division
 Pittsburgh Penguins, Metropolitan Division champions – 109 points
 New York Rangers – 96 points
 Philadelphia Flyers – 94 points

Wild cards
 Columbus Blue Jackets – 93 points (38 )
 Detroit Red Wings – 93 points (34 )

Western Conference

Central Division
 Colorado Avalanche, Central Division champions – 112 points
 St. Louis Blues – 111 points
 Chicago Blackhawks – 107 points

Pacific Division
 Anaheim Ducks, Pacific Division champions, Western Conference regular season champions – 116 points
 San Jose Sharks – 111 points
 Los Angeles Kings – 100 points

Wild cards
 Minnesota Wild – 98 points
 Dallas Stars – 91 points

Playoff bracket
In each round, teams competed in a best-of-seven series following a 2–2–1–1–1 format (scores in the bracket indicate the number of games won in each best-of-seven series). The team with home ice advantage played at home for games one and two (and games five and seven, if necessary), and the other team was at home for games three and four (and game six, if necessary). The top three teams in each division made the playoffs, along with two wild cards in each conference, for a total of eight teams from each conference.

In the First Round, the lower seeded wild card in the conference played against the division winner with the best record while the other wild card played against the other division winner, and both wild cards were de facto #4 seeds. The other series matched the second and third place teams from the divisions. In the first two rounds, home ice advantage was awarded to the team with the better seed; in the last two rounds, it was awarded to the team that had the better regular season record. Beginning in 2013–14, the NHL officially changed the names of the first two rounds of the playoffs from Conference Quarterfinal/Semifinal to First/Second Round.

First Round

Eastern Conference First Round

(A1) Boston Bruins vs. (WC2) Detroit Red Wings

The Boston Bruins won the Presidents' Trophy for earning the league's best record, with 117 points. The Detroit Red Wings earned 93 points during the regular season, and entered the playoffs as the Eastern Conference's second wild card. This was the eighth playoff meeting for these Original Six teams, with Boston having won four of the seven previous series. They last met in the 1957 Stanley Cup Semifinals, which Boston won in five games. The Red Wings won three of the four games in this year's regular season series.

The Bruins eliminated the Red Wings in five games. In game one, Pavel Datsyuk scored the only goal with 3:01 left in Detroit's 1–0 victory, but Boston went on to win four straight contests to capture the series. Four different Bruins players scored goals in Boston's 4–1 win in game two. Bruins goalie Tuukka Rask then stopped all 23 Detroit shots in a 3–0 victory in game three. In game four, Boston overcame a two-goal, second-period deficit, scoring three unanswered goals – including Jarome Iginla's game-winner at 13:32 of overtime to win 3–2. The Bruins clinched the series with a 4–2 win in game five, as Torey Krug recorded two assists, and Rask made 31 saves on 33 shots.

(A2) Tampa Bay Lightning vs. (A3) Montreal Canadiens

The Tampa Bay Lightning finished second overall in the Atlantic Division, earning 101 points. The Montreal Canadiens earned 100 points during the regular season, to finish third overall in the Atlantic Division. This was the second playoff meeting for these two teams. Their only previous meeting was in the 2004 Eastern Conference Semifinals, in which Tampa Bay swept Montreal out of the playoffs en route to their Stanley Cup victory. The Lightning won three of the four games in this year's regular season series.

The Canadiens swept the Lightning, who were without their starting goalie Ben Bishop after he suffered an injury during the last few weeks of the regular season. With Anders Lindback in the Tampa Bay net,
Steven Stamkos of the Lightning scored at 13:27 of the third period to tie game one, 4–4, before Montreal's Dale Weise won it at 18:08 of overtime. Rene Bourque scored two goals, and Carey Price stopped 26 out of 27 shots, in the Canadiens' 4–1 win in game two. At 15:38 of the second period of game three, Tampa Bay's Ryan Callahan appeared to give his team a 2–1 lead, but his goal was waved off as the officials ruled that there was contact between Alexander Killorn and Price; Montreal's Brendan Gallagher then scored minutes later, and the Canadiens went on to win 3–2. Max Pacioretty then scored a power-play goal at 19:17 of the third period of game four to give Montreal the 4–3 win and the series.

(M1) Pittsburgh Penguins vs. (WC1) Columbus Blue Jackets

The Pittsburgh Penguins finished first overall in the Metropolitan Division, earning 109 points. The Columbus Blue Jackets earned 93 points during the regular season, and entered the playoffs as the Eastern Conference's first wild card, making the post-season for the first time since 2009, and only the second time in the franchise's history. This was the first playoff meeting for these two teams. The Penguins won all five games in this year's regular season series.

The Blue Jackets recorded their first ever playoff victories in team history, but the Penguins still managed to win the series in six games. The first five games in the series featured comebacks, including 3–1 leads evaporating into 4–3 losses in the first four games. In game one, Pittsburgh scored three unanswered goals, including Brandon Sutter's game winner 8:18 in the third period, to overcome a two-goal deficit to win, 4–3. Columbus then overcame a two-goal deficit in game two after Pittsburgh built their lead with Brian Gibbons scoring his first two playoff goals, including a short-handed one. Matt Calvert then scored both a short-handed goal and then the game-winner 1:10 into double overtime to give the Blue Jackets their first playoff victory in franchise history. Game three saw Brooks Orpik score his second ever playoff goal with less than 2 seconds remaining in the second period. The Blue Jackets would jump back up to a two-goal lead at the start of the third period, thanks to Cam Atkinson's first ever playoff goal. But the Penguins scored three goals in a span of 2:13 in the third period, including Jussi Jokinen's game-winner at 8:06, for another 4–3 win. The Blue Jackets then overcame a three-goal deficit in game four to record a fourth 4–3 contest in this series, with Brandon Dubinsky tying the game with 24 seconds left in regulation after Penguins goalie Marc-Andre Fleury mishandled the puck from behind his own net, allowing Ryan Johansen to fling the puck to a wide open Dubinsky. Nick Foligno then scored the game-winner at 2:49 into overtime, which gave the Blue Jackets their first home playoff victory in team history. But Fleury rebounded in game five, making 23 saves out of 24 shots in Pittsburgh's 3–1 win. Columbus lost despite spectacular play by Sergei Bobrovsky, who stopped 48 of 50 shots but did not receive the goal support needed to win. In game six, Evgeni Malkin's second career playoff hat trick helped the Penguins build a 4–0 lead, but they had to withstand a late comeback attempt by the Blue Jackets, who scored three unanswered goals in a span of five minutes late in the third period, to hold on to the 4–3 victory.

(M2) New York Rangers vs. (M3) Philadelphia Flyers

The New York Rangers finished second overall in the Metropolitan Division, earning 96 points. The Philadelphia Flyers earned 94 points during the regular season, to finish third overall in the Metropolitan Division. This was the 11th playoff meeting for these rivals, with Philadelphia having won six of the ten previous series. Their most recent meeting was in the 1997 Eastern Conference Final, which Philadelphia won in five games. Each team won two games in this year's four-game regular season series.

The Rangers eliminated the Flyers in seven games. New York scored two power play goals, and Brad Richards recorded a goal and two assists, in a 4–1 victory in game one. The Flyers overcame a two-goal deficit, scoring four unanswered goals from four different players to win game two, 4–2. In game three, Daniel Girardi and Martin St. Louis each had a goal and an assist as they led the Rangers to another 4–1 win. Steve Mason then replaced Ray Emery as the starting goalie for the Flyers in game four. Mason went on to make 37 saves out of 38 shots, and Jakub Voracek scored the game-winning goal on a power play in the second period, as Philadelphia won, 2–1. However, Rangers goalie Henrik Lundqvist made 23 saves out of 25 shots en route to a 4–2 Rangers win in game five. Back at home in game six, Wayne Simmonds recorded a hat-trick, leading Philadelphia to a 5–2 win. Game seven was played the next night, where the Rangers jumped to a 2–0 lead in the second period, and with Henrik Lundqvist stopping 26 out of 27 shots, the Rangers hung on for a 2–1 win. The Rangers became the only NHL team to remain undefeated in a home game seven with a 6–0 franchise record.

Western Conference First Round

(C1) Colorado Avalanche vs. (WC1) Minnesota Wild

The Colorado Avalanche finished first overall in the Central Division, earning 112 points. The Minnesota Wild earned 98 points during the regular season and entered the playoffs as the Western Conference's first wild card. This was the third playoff meeting for these two teams; the Wild earned a seven-game series victory in the 2003 Western Conference Quarterfinals, while the Avalanche earned a six-game series victory in the 2008 Western Conference Quarterfinals. The Avalanche won four of the five games in this year's regular season series.

The Wild defeated the Avalanche in seven games. The home team had won the first six games in the series before Minnesota won game seven on the road. Throughout the series, Colorado head coach Patrick Roy used his strategy of pulling goalie Semyon Varlamov for an extra attacker earlier than usual when trailing late in the third period. In game one trailing by a goal, Roy pulled Varlamov with 3:01 remaining in regulation. Paul Stastny then tied the game with 13.4 seconds remaining and then scored the game-winner 7:27 into overtime to give the Avalanche a 5–4 win. Gabriel Landeskog then scored two goals in game two to lead Colorado to a 4–2 victory. In game three, Mikael Granlund scored the only goal 5:08 into overtime in Minnesota's 1–0 victory. The Wild then only allowed 12 Colorado shots in a 2–1 win in game four, even after Roy pulled Varlamov for the extra attacker with less than three minutes left. In game five (after Roy pulled Varlamov with 2:22 left in the third period), Colorado's P.A. Parenteau's game-tying goal with 1:14 remaining was met with controversy as the Avalanche appeared to have been offside on the play, but it was never called. Nathan MacKinnon then scored 3:27 into overtime to give the Avalanche a 4–3 win. Zach Parise scored two goals in game six, including the game-winner 13:31 into the third period that broke a 2–2 tie. This time, Roy's tactic of pulling Varlamov early backfired as the Wild scored two empty net goals to win, 5–2. In game seven, Minnesota's Jared Spurgeon tied the game, 4–4, at 17:33 in the third period, and Nino Niederreiter scored the series-winning goal 5:02 into overtime to give the Wild a 5–4 win.

(C2) St. Louis Blues vs. (C3) Chicago Blackhawks

The St. Louis Blues finished second overall in the Central Division, earning 111 points. The Chicago Blackhawks earned 107 points during the regular season, to finish third overall in the Central Division. This was the eleventh playoff meeting between these two teams, with Chicago having won seven of the ten previous series. Their most recent meeting was in the 2002 Western Conference Quarterfinals, which St. Louis won in five games. The Blues won three of the five games in this year's regular season series.

This was the second consecutive year in which St. Louis faced the defending Stanley Cup champions in the first round. Much like last year, the Blues would win the first two games at Scottrade Center, but then go on to lose the next four games. In game one, the Blues' Jaden Schwartz scored his first career playoff goal with 1:45 left in regulation to tie the score at 3–3, then Alexander Steen won it at 26 seconds into triple-overtime. In game two, the Blackhawks held a 3–2 lead in the third period, but with less than 5 minutes left in regulation Chicago's Brent Seabrook was called for a five-minute major penalty and a game misconduct (and later given a three-game suspension) for charging David Backes. Vladimir Tarasenko then tied the game on the ensuing power play, followed by Barret Jackman scoring the game-winner at 5:50 of overtime to give St. Louis a 4–3 win. Blackhawks goalie Corey Crawford then stopped all 34 Blues shots to help give Chicago a 2–0 victory in game three. In game four, Patrick Kane scored two of the Blackhawks' goals in a 4–3 win, including the game-winner at 11:17 of overtime in which he took a pass in the defensive zone and then raced up ice to score from a shot from the left circle. Jonathan Toews gave Chicago a 3–2 win in game five, scoring on a breakaway at 7:36 of overtime. The Blackhawks then clinched the series with a 5–1 victory in game six, scoring 4 unanswered goals in the third period.

(P1) Anaheim Ducks vs. (WC2) Dallas Stars

The Anaheim Ducks finished first overall in the Pacific Division, earning 116 points. The Dallas Stars earned 91 points during the regular season and entered the playoffs as the Western Conference's second wild card. This was the third playoff meeting for these two franchises; the Mighty Ducks earned a six-game series victory in the 2003 Western Conference Semifinals, while the Stars earned a six-game series victory in the 2008 Western Conference Quarterfinals. The Stars won two of the three games in this year's regular season series.

The Ducks defeated the Stars in six games. The first five games in this series were won by the home team. Anaheim head coach Bruce Boudreau decided to start the series with Frederik Andersen in net, who was the hotter goalie going into the postseason, rather than original Ducks starter Jonas Hiller. Anaheim jumped to a 4–0 lead in game one but had to hold off a Dallas comeback in a 4–3 win. The Ducks scored three unanswered goals in game two, but had to hold off another Stars comeback to preserve a 3–2 victory. The series moved to Dallas for game three, where Stars goalie Kari Lehtonen stopped all 37 Anaheim shots to earn his first playoff victory in a 3–0 win. Dallas then evened the series with a 4–2 victory in game four, scoring 4 unanswered goals to overcome a two-goal deficit. Returning to Anaheim for game five, the Ducks scored three unanswered goals in the third period to pull away for a 6–2 victory. Back in Dallas for game six, the Stars built a 4–2 lead in the second period before Boudreau decided to replace Andersen with Hiller. Anaheim then staged a comeback, first with Nick Bonino's goal with 2:10 remaining in regulation, and then Devante Smith-Pelly's score with 24 seconds left to tie the game and force overtime. Both of these goals occurred with the goalie pulled to give the Ducks an extra attacker. Bonino then scored at 2:47 into the extra period to give the Ducks a 5–4 win; it was the only game in the series won by the road team.

(P2) San Jose Sharks vs. (P3) Los Angeles Kings

The San Jose Sharks finished second overall in the Pacific Division, earning 111 points. The Los Angeles Kings earned 100 points during the regular season, to finish third overall in the Pacific Division. This was the third playoff meeting between these two teams; the Sharks earned a six-game series victory in the 2011 Western Conference Quarterfinals, while the Kings earned a seven-game series victory in the 2013 Western Conference Semifinals. The Kings won three of the five games in this year's regular season series.

The Kings became just the fourth team in NHL playoff history (after the 1942 Toronto Maple Leafs, 1975 New York Islanders, and the 2010 Philadelphia Flyers) to come back from a 3–0 deficit to win a series 4–3. The Sharks controlled the first two games in the series, winning 6–3 and 7–2 in game one and game two, respectively, scoring 12 total goals on Kings goalie Jonathan Quick and an empty netter. In game three, Patrick Marleau scored at 6:20 into overtime to give San Jose a 4–3 victory. However, in game four Justin Williams scored two goals to lead Los Angeles to a 6–3 win. At San Jose for game five, Quick posted a shutout, as he stopped all 30 San Jose shots. In game six, San Jose head coach Todd McLellan started goalie Alex Stalock instead of Antti Niemi. Williams' game-winning goal (his second of the game) at 11:56 into the third period of game six to break a 1–1 tie was met with controversy. Stalock attempted to control a loose puck in his crease, but Williams managed to poke it through Stalock's legs across the goal line. It appeared that Williams pushed Stalock backwards during the play, and the puck seemed to disappear out of sight under the goalie's pads before Williams poked at it. The play went to video review but the call of goal on the ice stood. The Kings' Anze Kopitar then scored two more unanswered goals in a 4–1 victory. Niemi was reinstated as the Sharks starter for game seven, but the Kings scored 5 unanswered goals, and killed all six San Jose power plays, to win the game 5–1. Mike Richards and Jeff Carter, who both played for the Flyers in 2010, became the first players in NHL history to be part of two teams that won the final four games of a series, after initially facing a 3–0 series deficit.

Second Round

Eastern Conference Second Round

(A1) Boston Bruins vs. (A3) Montreal Canadiens

One of the greatest rivalries in North American professional sports, this was the 34th meeting between these teams in the postseason, which is the most frequent playoff series in NHL history. Coming into the series, Montreal owned a record of 24–9 against Boston in the 33 previous series played by the teams, and had won 18 straight between 1946 and 1987. However, the Bruins had won the two most recent series between these two teams, the last of which was a seven-game Boston victory in the 2011 Eastern Conference Quarterfinals. The Canadiens won three of the four games in this year's regular season series.

The Canadiens eliminated the Bruins in seven games. P. K. Subban scored 4:17 into the second overtime to give Montreal a 4–3 victory in game one. In game two, the Bruins scored four unanswered goals in the third period to overcome a two-goal deficit to win 5–3. In game three, the Canadiens built a 3–0 lead, as Subban and Dale Weise each had a goal and an assist, en route to a 4–2 win. Matt Fraser then scored the only goal in game four at 1:19 into overtime in Boston's 1–0 victory. In game five, Reilly Smith and Jarome Iginla scored two power play goals 32 seconds apart in the second period to help give the Bruins a 4–2 win. However, Carey Price stopped all 26 Boston shots, and Thomas Vanek scored two goals, helping to give Montreal a 4–0 win in game six. In Boston for game seven, Montreal defeated the Bruins 3–1, as Price made 29 saves.

(M1) Pittsburgh Penguins vs. (M2) New York Rangers

This was the fifth playoff meeting for these two teams, with Pittsburgh winning all four previous playoff series. Their most recent meeting was in the 2008 Eastern Conference Semifinals, which Pittsburgh won in five games. Each team won two games in this year's four-game regular season series.

For the first time in their team history, the Rangers overcame a 3–1 game deficit to win a seven-game series. The team who scored first won the game for all seven contests in the series. Much was made early on about scheduling, as the Rangers played five games in seven days, due to going to seven games in the first round and scheduling conflicts at Madison Square Garden. They were the first team to have such a playoff schedule in 25 years, and early on it looked like the schedule might adversely affect the Rangers' chances, noted by many including Rangers coach Alain Vigneault. Derick Brassard scored 3:06 into overtime to give New York a 3–2 victory in game one. Penguins goalie Marc-Andre Fleury then recorded two consecutive shutouts, stopping all 22 shots in a 3–0 win in game two and 35 shots in a 2–0 victory in game three. Fleury's back-to-back shutouts on back-to-back calendar days was the first time this was ever achieved in franchise history. It was also the first time the Rangers were shut out in back-to-back playoff games since 1937. Pittsburgh also took in game four, 4–2, as Evgeni Malkin had a goal and an assist, and Sidney Crosby recorded two assists. Between games four and five, Rangers forward Martin St. Louis received the news that his mother unexpectedly died at the age of 63 due to a heart attack. Despite being in mourning, St. Louis remained in the lineup, and the emotional spark that it provided turned New York around. The Rangers began their comeback with a 5–1 win in game five, as Brassard scored two of New York's goals and Mats Zuccarello recorded three assists. New York then recorded a 3–1 victory in game six, with three different players scoring goals. Finally, Brad Richards's power play goal 7:56 into the second period proved to be the difference in the Rangers' 2–1 victory in game seven.

Western Conference Second Round

(C3) Chicago Blackhawks vs. (WC1) Minnesota Wild

This was the second playoff meeting for these two teams. Their only previous meeting was in the 2013 Western Conference Quarterfinals, which Chicago won in five games. The Wild won three of the five games in this year's regular season series.

The Blackhawks eliminated the Wild in six games. The first five games in the series were won by the home team. Patrick Kane scored two goals to help give Chicago a 5–2 victory in game one. In game two, Bryan Bickell had a goal and two assists in Chicago's 4–1 win. The Wild won game three, 4–0, scoring four goals in the third period and limiting Chicago to only 19 shots on goal. Four different Minnesota players then recorded goals in the Wild's 4–2 victory in game four. In game five, Jonathan Toews scored the game-winning goal at 4:33 into the third period to break a 1–1 tie, and thus give the Blackhawks a 2–1 win. Game six in Minnesota went into overtime, where Kane scored the winning goal after the puck deflected off the glass behind the Wild net and then rolled into the slot, allowing him to take a shot just under the Minnesota crossbar.

(P1) Anaheim Ducks vs. (P3) Los Angeles Kings

This was the first playoff meeting between the Pacific Division and crosstown rivals. The Ducks won four of the five games in this year's regular season series, including a 3–0 win at the NHL's inaugural Stadium Series game held at Dodger Stadium.

The Kings eliminated the Ducks in seven games. The first four games in the series were won by the visiting team. Anaheim head coach Bruce Boudreau started game one with Jonas Hiller in net. However, Marian Gaborik tied the game with about seven seconds remaining in regulation, then scored the game-winner 12:17 into overtime to give Los Angeles a 3–2 win. The Kings also won game two, 3–1, as goalie Jonathan Quick only allowed one power play goal out of 37 shots. Boudreau then named Frederik Andersen as his starting goalie for game three. Andersen made 22 saves out of 23 shots before leaving in the third period due to a lower-body injury. Hiller went into the game as Andersen's replacement and made 7 saves out of 8 shots to help preserve a 3–2 victory for the Ducks. With Anaheim's starting goalie situation still in flux, Boudreau decided to turn to rookie John Gibson for game four. The 20-year-old Gibson then became the youngest goalie in NHL history to record a shutout in his playoff debut, making 28 saves to give Anaheim a 2–0 win. Gibson followed up his performance by recording 39 saves out of 42 shots, and Devante Smith-Pelly scored two goals, to help give the Ducks a 4–3 win in game five. However, the Kings built a 2–0 second period lead in game six en route to a 2–1 win. Los Angeles then controlled most of game seven, building a 4–0 second period lead before Boudreau opted to replace Gibson with Hiller. The Kings then scored another goal against Hiller to make it 5–0 and held to win, 6–2, to advance to the Conference Finals.

Conference Finals

Eastern Conference Final

(A3) Montreal Canadiens vs. (M2) New York Rangers

This was the fifteenth playoff meeting for these two Original Six teams, with each team having won seven of the fourteen previous playoff series. Their most recent meeting was in the 1996 Eastern Conference Quarterfinals, which the Rangers won in six games. Montreal most recently made it to the Conference Finals in 2010, losing to the Philadelphia Flyers in five games, while the Rangers made it to the Conference Finals in 2012, losing in six games to the New Jersey Devils. Montreal won two of the three games in this year's regular season series.

New York defeated Montreal in six games. With the Rangers holding a 2–1 lead midway through the second period of game one, New York's Chris Kreider collided with Carey Price, injuring the Montreal goalie's knee. Although Price finished the rest of the period, he did not return for the rest of the series. Peter Budaj played for the rest of the game but the Rangers won 7–2. Canadiens head coach Michel Therrien started rookie goalie Dustin Tokarski in game two. However Henrik Lundqvist stopped 40 of 41 shots, helping New York to a 3–1 victory.

Early in the first period of game three, Montreal's Brandon Prust leveled Derek Stepan but the referees missed the interference call; the league would later suspend Prust two games. Later in the first period, Daniel Carcillo was penalized for charging into Prust from behind. As linesman Scott Driscoll attempted to escort Carcillo to the penalty box, Carcillo physically attempted to get away from Driscoll, leading to an automatic game misconduct and multi-game suspension. Meanwhile, the last three goals of the game were scored on rebounds and deflections. At 16:58 of the third period, Daniel Briere's shot deflected off of the Rangers's Ryan McDonagh's skate and into the net to give the Canadiens a 2–1 lead. New York then tied the game at 19:31 of the third period after Dan Girardi's shot deflected of off Chris Kreider and bounced off of Montreal's Alexei Emelin's skate into the net. And finally, 72 seconds into overtime, Tomas Plekanec's shot deflected off of Alex Galchenyuk into the New York net to give the Canadiens the 3–2 win.

The Rangers won game four, 3–2, as Martin St. Louis scored 6:02 into overtime. The Canadiens then bounced back in game five, winning 7–4, as they scored 4 goals out of their first 18 shots, and Rene Bourque recorded a hat-trick. However, Dominic Moore scored game six's only goal late in the second period and with a 1–0 win the Rangers advanced to the Stanley Cup Finals for the first time in twenty years.

Western Conference Final

(C3) Chicago Blackhawks vs. (P3) Los Angeles Kings

This was the third playoff meeting between these two franchises, with Chicago having won both of their previous playoff meetings. This was a rematch of the previous year's Western Conference Final, which Chicago won in five games. This was the third straight Conference Finals appearance for the Kings, while it was Chicago's fourth trip to the Conference Finals since 2009. Chicago won all three games in this year's regular season series.

The Kings eliminated the Blackhawks in seven games. Chicago took game one, 3–1, as Brandon Saad recorded a goal and assist, and Corey Crawford made 26 saves. In game two, the Kings scored six unanswered goals, including a hat trick from Jeff Carter, to come back from a 2–0 deficit to win 6–2. Jonathan Toews scored two goals in the first period of game three to give the Blackhawks a 2–1 lead after twenty minutes, but Los Angeles's second line of Carter, Tyler Toffoli, and Tanner Pearson created two second period goals and the Kings won 4–3. The Kings also dominated game four, building a 4–0 lead in the second period en route to a 5–2 victory. Although the Kings rallied to tie game five after falling behind 3–1 in the first period, Michal Handzus scored at 2:04 of double overtime to give the Blackhawks a 5–4 victory. Drew Doughty and Patrick Kane both had a goal and an assist in the third period of a back-and-forth game six, which the Blackhawks won 4–3. The Blackhawks scored the first two goals of game seven. The Kings cut the lead in half with a controversial goal when Kings forward, Jeff Carter, appeared to be offside. The Kings briefly tied the game on a goal by Justin Williams, only to have the Blackhawks regain a 4–3 lead after two Patrick Sharp goals. But Marian Gaborik converted Dustin Brown's rebound to tie the game in the third period, and at 5:47 of overtime Alec Martinez's wrist shot from the blue line deflected past Crawford to give the Kings a 5–4 victory and a spot in the Stanley Cup Finals, for the second time in three years.

Stanley Cup Finals

This was the third playoff meeting for these two teams, with the Rangers having won both previous series. They last met in the 1981 Preliminary Round, a best-of-five series which the Rangers won 3–1. This was the first major professional sports championship final between New York City and Los Angeles since the Dodgers beat the Yankees in the 1981 World Series in a strike-shortened season.

The Kings and Rangers split this year's two-game regular season series. This was the third Finals appearance for the Kings, while the Rangers made their eleventh Finals appearance. This was the first time a Norwegian player appeared in the Finals (Mats Zuccarello of the New York Rangers).

Player statistics

Skaters
These are the top ten skaters based on points.

Goaltending
This is a combined table of the top five goaltenders based on goals against average (GAA) and the top five goaltenders based on save percentage, with at least 420 minutes played. The table is sorted by GAA, and the criteria for inclusion are bolded.

Television
In Canada, the Stanley Cup Playoffs were broadcast by CBC, TSN and RDS, with each network having exclusive broadcast rights to selected series throughout, and CBC having exclusive rights to the finals. This season marked the final playoffs broadcast by TSN and RDS, as Rogers Media, Sportsnet and TVA took over national broadcast rights to the NHL beginning in the 2014–15 season (although CBC went on to air Rogers-produced coverage of the playoffs and finals). Due to scheduling conflicts with a Toronto Raptors NBA playoff game on TSN, game three of the Rangers-Flyers first round series on April 22 was moved to Sportsnet 360—a sister network of the future rightsholder, and joined in progress by TSN following the game.

In the United States, all playoff games were nationally televised by either NBCSN, CNBC, NHL Network, or NBC. During the first round, these telecasts co-existed with those of regional rightsholders, after which NBC had exclusive rights to the remaining games.

References

play
Stanley Cup playoffs